La obertura is a 1977 Argentine comedy film directed by Julio Saraceni.

Cast

 Silvia Balán
 Edda Bustamante
 Beto Gianola
 Antonio Grimau
 Katia Iaros
 Morena Jara
 Nelly Lainez
 Ricardo Lavié
 Don Pelele
 Ethel Rojo
 Mario Sapag
 Raimundo Soto
 Amelia Vargas
 Enzo Viena

(plus others)

External links
 

1977 films
Argentine comedy films
1970s Spanish-language films
1970s Argentine films